The 1995 NCAA Division I men's basketball tournament involved 64 schools playing in single-elimination play to determine the national champion of men's NCAA Division I college basketball. It began on March 16, 1995, and ended with the championship game on April 3 at the Kingdome in Seattle, Washington. A total of 63 games were played.

The Final Four consisted of UCLA, making their fifteenth appearance and first since the 1980 team that eventually saw their appearance vacated, Oklahoma State, making their fifth appearance and first since 1951, North Carolina, making their twelfth appearance and second in three years, and Arkansas, the defending national champions.

The championship game saw UCLA win their eleventh national championship and first (and only) national title under Jim Harrick by defeating Arkansas 89–78, foiling the Razorbacks' hopes of back to back national titles.

UCLA's Ed O'Bannon was named the tournament's Most Outstanding Player.

Schedule and venues

The following are the sites that were selected to host each round of the 1995 tournament:

First and Second Rounds
March 16 and 18
East Region
 Baltimore Arena, Baltimore, Maryland (Host: University of Maryland Baltimore County)
Midwest Region
 University of Dayton Arena, Dayton, Ohio (Host: University of Dayton)
Southeast Region
 Memphis Pyramid, Memphis, Tennessee (Host: University of Memphis)
West Region
 Jon M. Huntsman Center, Salt Lake City, Utah (Host: University of Utah)
March 17 and 19
East Region
 Knickerbocker Arena, Albany, New York (Hosts: Siena College, Metro Atlantic Athletic Conference)
Midwest Region
 Frank Erwin Center, Austin, Texas (Host: University of Texas at Austin)
Southeast Region
 Tallahassee-Leon County Civic Center, Tallahassee, Florida (Host: Florida State University)
West Region
 BSU Pavilion, Boise, Idaho (Host: Boise State University)

Regional semifinals and finals (Sweet Sixteen and Elite Eight)
March 23 and 25
Southeast Regional, BJCC Coliseum, Birmingham, Alabama (Host: Southeastern Conference)
West Regional, Oakland–Alameda County Coliseum Arena, Oakland, California (Host: University of California, Berkeley)
March 24 and 26
East Regional, Brendan Byrne Arena, East Rutherford, New Jersey (Hosts: Seton Hall University, Big East Conference)
Midwest Regional, Kemper Arena, Kansas City, Missouri (Host: Missouri Valley Conference)

National semifinals and championship (Final Four and championship)
April 1 and 3
Kingdome, Seattle, Washington (Hosts: Seattle University, University of Washington)

For the third and final time, the Kingdome served as the host venue for the Final Four. It would be the last tournament games at the multipurpose stadium, which was demolished in 2000 to make way for Lumen Field. The 1995 tournament saw four new host venues in three new cities. For the first time, the New York capital of Albany hosted tournament games at Knickerbocker Arena, the off-campus home of the Siena Saints men's basketball team. Baltimore hosted its first and, to date, only tournament games at the Baltimore Arena, as did Tallahassee's Leon County Civic Center, the home of the Florida State Seminoles men's basketball team. To date, this marked the last time the tournament has been held in the state of Maryland. Tallahassee was the fourth new city in three years in the state of Florida. And for the second time, the tournament returned to Memphis, this time at the Pyramid Arena, the home to the Memphis Tigers men's basketball team. Future tournament games played in Seattle would be played at Key Arena up to 2015; and likely Climate Pledge Arena thereafter.

Teams

Bracket
* – Denotes overtime period

East Regional – East Rutherford, New Jersey

Game summaries

East first round

at Albany, New York

East second round

at Albany, New York

West Regional – Oakland, California

Southeast Regional – Birmingham, Alabama

Midwest Regional – Kansas City, Missouri

Final Four - Seattle, Washington

Game summaries

National Championship

*Named Most Outstanding Player

Notes
 March 19, 1995 – A final shot in the second round at The Boise State Pavilion is one of the most memorable moments in NCAA history. UCLA's Tyus Edney dashed the length of the 94-foot court in just over 4 seconds to make a layup that gave the Bruins a 75-74 win over Missouri, which sustained UCLA's run to a national title that year.
 April 3, 1995 – Ed O'Bannon scored 30 points and grabbed 17 rebounds and is named the tournament's Most Outstanding Player as the Bruins win the championship 89–78 over Arkansas. Cameron Dollar played 36 minutes and contributed eight assists and four steals while filling in for an injured Edney, who did not return after leaving with 17:23 left in the first half. The Bruins enjoyed the biggest lead 34–26 in the first half, but led only by a point at halftime 40–39.
 To date, this is the last NCAA men's basketball tournament in which no team seeded lower than #6 reached the Sweet Sixteen.
 Five teams - Colgate, FIU, Gonzaga, Mount St. Mary's and Nicholls State - made their debut in this tournament, all as conference winners. Only FIU has failed to return to the tournament since; Gonzaga would miss the next three tournaments before starting their current streak of making every tournament since 1999.
 The 1995 tournament was the last to feature teams from the Metro and Great Midwest Conferences, as the two would merge later that year to form Conference USA.
 Tulane, a charter member of the Metro, has not returned to the NCAA tournament since.

Announcers

Television
Once again, CBS served as broadcasters on television for the tournament.
Studio: Pat O'Brien (daytime) First round, Regional, Final Four, Jim Nantz (primetime) First round & all of Second Round, and Clark Kellogg.
Dick Stockton/Jim Nantz  and Billy Packer – Stockton/Packer, First & Second Round at Baltimore, Maryland; Nantz/Packer, Midwest Regional at Kansas City, Missouri; Final Four at Seattle, Washington
Sean McDonough and Bill Raftery – First & Second Round at Dayton, Ohio; Southeast Regional at Birmingham, Alabama
Verne Lundquist and Quinn Buckner – First & Second Round at Tallahassee, Florida; East Regional at East Rutherford, New Jersey
Tim Ryan and Al McGuire – First & Second Round at Boise, Idaho; West Regional at Oakland, California
Mike Gorman and Ann Meyers – First & Second Round at Memphis, Tennessee
Mike Emrick and George Raveling – First & Second Round at Albany, New York
Ted Robinson and Derrek Dickey – First & Second Round at Salt Lake City, Utah
Dave Sims and Dan Bonner – First & Second Round at Austin, Texas

Radio
CBS Radio was once again the radio home for the tournament.

First and second rounds
John Rooney
Marty Brennaman
Gary Cohen and Dave Gavitt – 1st & 2nd Round at Albany, New York
Wayne Larrivee
Brad Sham
Gus Johnson and Reggie Theus

Regionals
John Rooney
Marty Brennaman
Gary Cohen and Dave Gavitt – East Regional at East Rutherford, New Jersey
Wayne Larrivee

Final Four
John Rooney and Bill Raftery – (UCLA-Oklahoma State and championship Game) Final Four at Seattle, Washington
Marty Brennaman and Ron Franklin – (Arkansas-North Carolina) Final Four at Seattle, Washington

See also
 1995 NCAA Division II men's basketball tournament
 1995 NCAA Division III men's basketball tournament
 1995 NCAA Division I women's basketball tournament
 1995 NCAA Division II women's basketball tournament
 1995 NCAA Division III women's basketball tournament
 1995 National Invitation Tournament
 1995 National Women's Invitation Tournament
 1995 NAIA Division I men's basketball tournament
 1995 NAIA Division II men's basketball tournament
 1995 NAIA Division I women's basketball tournament
 1995 NAIA Division II women's basketball tournament

References

NCAA Division I men's basketball tournament
Ncaa
Basketball in Austin, Texas
Basketball competitions in Seattle
NCAA Division I men's basketball tournament
NCAA Division I men's basketball tournament
NCAA Division I men's basketball tournament
NCAA Division I men's basketball tournament